The following is a list of films produced in the Kannada film industry in India in 1967, presented in alphabetical order.

See also
Kannada films of 1966
Kannada films of 1968

References

External links
 Kannada Movies of 1967's at the Internet Movie Database
 http://www.bharatmovies.com/kannada/info/moviepages.htm
 http://www.kannadastore.com/

1967
Kannada
Films, Kannada